Hickory High School is located in Hickory, North Carolina, United States.  It is a public high school in the Hickory City School system, located in Catawba County.

General information
Hickory High School moved to its current location of 1234 3rd Street NE, in 1972. Hickory High is currently classified as a NCHSAA 3A high school. It is the largest school within the Hickory City School district.

Athletics
Hickory High sports teams compete as members of the North Carolina High School Athletic Association (NCHSAA) in the 3A classification. They are currently in the Western Foothills 3A Athletic Conference. The school colors are garnet and gold, and the sports teams are known as the Red Tornadoes. Team and individual state championships have been won in a variety of sports.

Hickory has won the following team NCHSAA state championships:

 3A Women's Basketball – 1995, 1998, 1999, 2015
 3A Football – 1996
 3A Men's Golf – 2001, 2003, 2007, 2009
 3A Men's Soccer – 2001
 All Classes Women's Swimming – 1981
 1A/2A/3A Women's Swimming – 1994
 4A Men's Tennis – 1989
 3A Men's Tennis – 2004, 2006, 2021
 3A Women's Tennis – 1993, 2006

Clubs and organizations 

The Quill Writing Team competes in writing competitions, in which they are given 90 minutes to complete an essay on given writing prompts. In 2016 and 2017, they won The Quill State Finals.

Notable people

Alumni
Austin M. Allran, member of the North Carolina General Assembly
Jeff Barkley, former MLB pitcher
Rick Barnes, college basketball head coach
Gary Glenn, political activist and former member of the Michigan House of Representatives
Ryan Hill, long-distance track runner
Austin Johnson, former NFL fullback
E. Patrick Johnson, the Carlos Montezuma Professor of Performance Studies and Professor of African-American Studies at Northwestern University
Trevin Parks, professional basketball player
J.T. Poston, professional golfer
Ryan Succop, current NFL kicker and Super Bowl LV champion
Chris Washburn, former NBA player
Andy Wells, served in the North Carolina House of Representatives and North Carolina Senate

Faculty
Frank Barger, high school athletics coach and member of the North Carolina Sports Hall of Fame
Elwood L. Perry, teacher, author, and inventor of the fishing lure known as the spoonplug

References

External links

Official School Athletic Site
Hickory City Schools Website

Hickory, North Carolina
Public high schools in North Carolina
Schools in Catawba County, North Carolina
1972 establishments in North Carolina
Educational institutions established in 1972